The 1951 All-Ireland Senior  Football Championship Final was the 64th All-Ireland Final and the deciding match of the 1951 All-Ireland Senior Football Championship, an inter-county Gaelic football tournament for the top teams in Ireland. Mayo and Meath met to decide the destination of the Sam Maguire Cup.

Match
Mayo won their second title in a row with goals by Tom Langan and Joe Gilvarry.

This was Mayo's second consecutive All-Ireland football title. They have not won an All-Ireland football title since. It is said that a legendary curse overshadows Mayo football since 1951 - see Sports-related curses.

55 years later...
Mayo players Willie Casey, Paddy Jordan and former GAA President Dr. Mick Loftus belatedly received their All-Ireland senior football medals 55 years later. Though squad members, they had not appeared as substitutes in the final and had initially been denied their medals.

References

All-Ireland Senior Football Championship Final
All-Ireland Senior Football Championship Final, 1951
All-Ireland Senior Football Championship Finals
All-Ireland Senior Football Championship Finals
Mayo county football team matches
Meath county football team matches